Trimethylsilyl azide ((CH3)3SiN3) is a chemical compound used as a reagent in organic chemistry.

Preparation
Trimethylsilyl azide is commercially available. It may be prepared by the reaction of trimethylsilyl chloride and sodium azide:

 TMSCl + NaN3 → TMSN3 + NaCl (TMS = (CH3)3Si)

Applications
It is considered a safer alternative to hydrazoic acid in many reactions; however, over time it will hydrolyze to hydrazoic acid, and therefore must be stored free of moisture. It has been used in the Oseltamivir total synthesis.

Safety
Trimethylsilyl azide is incompatible with moisture, strong oxidizing agents, and strong acids. In 2014, a graduate student at the University of Minnesota was injured in an explosion that occurred in the synthesis of a large batch of trimethylsilyl azide.

References

Azido compounds
Reagents for organic chemistry
Trimethylsilyl compounds